Chakoora, Pulwama is notified area and town in Pulwama district of Jammu and Kashmir, India. It is located 17 km towards east from District headquarters Pulwama and 37 km from the summer capital of Srinagar. It is situated on the Boundary of Pulwama District.

References

Cities and towns in Pulwama district
Villages in Pulwama district
Jammu and Kashmir